is a Japanese footballer who plays as a midfielder for J2 League club Blaublitz Akita.

Career
Tomofumi Fujiyama joined J3 League club Blaublitz Akita in 2017. After three seasons with the club, Fujiyama joined Nagano Parceiro in 2020. He returned to Akita in July 2021.

Club statistics
Updated to 2 December 2022.

Honours
 Blaublitz Akita
 J3 League (1): 2017

References

External links
Profile at Blaublitz Akita
Profile at Nagano

1994 births
Living people
National Institute of Fitness and Sports in Kanoya alumni
Association football people from Mie Prefecture
Japanese footballers
J3 League players
Blaublitz Akita players
AC Nagano Parceiro players
Association football midfielders